Sony Pictures Entertainment Inc. (commonly known as Sony Pictures or SPE, and formerly known as Columbia Pictures Entertainment, Inc.) is an American diversified multinational mass media and entertainment studio conglomerate that produces, acquires, and distributes filmed entertainment (theatrical motion pictures, television programs, and recorded videos) through multiple platforms.

Through an intermediate holding company called Sony Film Holding Inc., it is operated as a subsidiary of Sony Entertainment Inc., which is itself a subsidiary of the multinational technology and media conglomerate Sony Group Corporation. Based at the Sony Pictures Studios lot in Culver City, California as one of the "Big Five" major American film studios, it encompasses Sony's motion picture, television production and distribution units. Its sales in the fiscal year 2020 (April 2020 – March 2021) was reported to be $7.16 billion. All of SPE's divisions are members of the Motion Picture Association (MPA). Sony's film franchises include The Karate Kid, Ghostbusters, Spider-Man, Jumanji, Men in Black, and Sony's Spider-Man Universe.

History 
On September 1, 1987, The Coca-Cola Company announced plans to spin off its assets of Columbia Pictures, which it had owned since 1982. Under this arrangement, Coca-Cola would sell its entertainment assets (a.k.a. Coca-Cola's Entertainment Business Sector) to TriStar Pictures, of which it owned 39.6%. Tri-Star would be renamed as Columbia Pictures Entertainment, Inc. (CPE), with Coca-Cola owning 49%, its shareholders owning 31%, and Tri-Star's shareholders owning 20%. As part of a merger plan, the two television business, comprising Columbia/Embassy Television and Tri-Star Television, merged altogether to form a new incarnation of the original Columbia Pictures Television.

The merger enabled three top Tri-Star executives, namely Arnold Messner, who ran Tri-Star Telecommunications, Victor A. Kaufman, who ran the main Tri-Star Pictures studio, and Scott Siegler, who ran Tri-Star Television to stay on, while four of the Coca-Cola Entertainment Business Sector had departed, namely Barbara Corday, who ran Columbia/Embassy Television as president, Herman Rush and Peter Seale, who ran Coca-Cola Telecommunications and Brian McGrath, who was the president of the Coca-Cola Entertainment Business Sector. In early December 1987, former Coke EBS vice president Kenneth Lemberger had exited the post to join Tri-Star Pictures, displacing Roger Faxon, who had joined Columbia Pictures as senior vice president of the studio.

The merger was approved by shareholders on December 15, 1987, and it was completed two days later, and that the Columbia and Tri-Star brands would be used as separate and autonomous production entities, and are part of CPE whole, along with the prior assets, units and commitments of the former Coca-Cola Entertainment Business Sector, which included all feature, TV, home video, pay cable operations, the Entertainment Sector's feature production deal with Nelson Entertainment and its ties with an investment in Castle Rock Entertainment, and TeleVentures, a company continues to own, which was linked to three independent companies Tri-Star Television, Stephen J. Cannell Productions and Witt/Thomas Productions, and Merv Griffin Enterprises continue to function as a separate operation. A new company was formed in early 1988 with the Tri-Star name to take over the studio's operations.

In early January 1988, CPE announced that they would revive the Triumph branding for the new worldwide subsidiary, Triumph Releasing Corporation, which was functioned as a theatrical distributor, marketing and promotion for Columbia and Tri-Star films, and named Patrick N. Williamson as president of the unit and the company provided administrative services related to distribution of its films in North America, while internationally, would be responsible for the direction of each studio.

On September 28, 1989, Sony obtained an option to purchase all of The Coca-Cola Company's stock (approximately 54 million shares or 49% of the outstanding shares) in CPE for $27 per share. The next day, Sony also announced that it reached an agreement with Guber-Peters Entertainment Company, Inc. (NASDAQ: GPEC; formerly Barris Industries, Inc.) to acquire CPE for $200 million when Sony hired Peter Guber and Jon Peters to be its co-chairmen. This was all led by Norio Ohga, who was the president and CEO of Sony during that time.

The hiring of Guber and Peters by Sony to run Columbia was conflicted by a previous contract the producers had signed at Warner Bros. Time Warner's chairman, Steve Ross, threatened Sony with a lawsuit for breach of contract. The lawsuit would be subsequently dropped when Sony sold half-interest in Columbia House and cable distribution rights to Columbia's feature films, TV movies, and miniseries to Warner Bros. That same agreement also saw Columbia sell its 35% interest in the Burbank Studios and acquired Lorimar Studios, previously the MGM lot, from Warner Bros.

On October 31, 1989, Sony completed a friendly takeover bid for the rest of shares (51%) of CPE, which was a public company listed on the New York Stock Exchange (NYSE: KPE), and acquired 99.3% of the common stock of the company. On November 8, 1989, Sony completed the acquisition by a "short-form" merger of its wholly owned subsidiary Sony Columbia Acquisition Corporation into CPE under the Delaware General Corporation Law. Sony also completed a tender offer for shares of common stock of the Guber-Peters Entertainment Company on November 6, 1989, and acquired the company 3 days later. The acquisition cost Sony $4.9 billion ($3.55 billion for shares and $1.4 billion of long-term debt) and was backed (financed) by five major Japanese banks Mitsui, Tokyo, Fuji, Mitsubishi and Industrial Bank of Japan. The company was renamed as Sony Pictures Entertainment on August 7, 1991. Also that year, Jon Peters left Columbia to start Peters Entertainment with a three-year exclusive production agreement at the studio at first, before transitioning to a non-exclusive deal at the studio. Longtime CPE employee Laurie MacDonald also left to start Aerial Pictures at the studio, first for a two-year deal, before going to 20th Century Fox in 1993, and being swallowed up by Amblin Entertainment later that year, eventually setting up DreamWorks.

Sony has since created numerous other film production and distribution units, such as creating Sony Pictures Classics for art-house fare, by forming Columbia TriStar Pictures (also known as the Columbia TriStar Motion Picture Group) by merging Columbia Pictures and TriStar Pictures in 1998, revitalizing Columbia's former television division Screen Gems. It expanded its operations on April 8, 2005, when a Sony-led consortium acquired the legendary Hollywood studio Metro-Goldwyn-Mayer (MGM), in a US$4.8 billion leveraged buyout, through the holding company MGM Holdings Inc.

This in effect re-united the MGM studio name, with the MGM main studio lot, although somewhat confusingly, the bulk of the pre-May 1986 original MGM library ended up at Time Warner via the Ted Turner-Kirk Kerkorian "Turner Entertainment Co." transactions. The post-April 1986 MGM library consists of acquisitions of various third-party libraries, such as the Orion Pictures catalogue, leading to MGM's 2014 remake of RoboCop.

In July 2000, a marketing executive working for Sony Corporation created a fictitious film critic, David Manning, who gave consistently good reviews for releases from Sony subsidiary Columbia Pictures that generally received poor reviews amongst real critics. Sony later pulled the ads, suspended Manning's creator and his supervisor and paid fines to the state of Connecticut and to fans who saw the reviewed films in the US.

On June 4, 2008, SPE's wholly owned group 2JS Productions B.V. acquired Dutch production company 2waytraffic N.V., famous for Who Wants to Be a Millionaire?, acquired from the original production company Celador, and You Are What You Eat for £114.3 million ($223.2 million in US dollars).

In 2011, the Sony Pictures computer network was breached and approximately one million user accounts associated with the SonyPictures.com website were leaked.

On November 18, 2012, Sony Pictures announced it has passed $4 billion with the success of releases: Skyfall, The Amazing Spider-Man, 21 Jump Street, Men in Black 3, Hotel Transylvania, Underworld: Awakening, The Vow, and Resident Evil: Retribution. On November 21, 2013, SPE and Sony Entertainment's CEO Michael Lynton announced that SPE will shift emphasis from movies to television by cutting its 2014 film slate. It was also announced on the same day, that there will be more Spider-Man sequels and spin-offs, though on February 10, 2015, Sony Pictures eventually signed a deal with Disney's Marvel Studios to allow Spider-Man to appear in the Marvel Cinematic Universe, beginning with Captain America: Civil War, before appearing in Spider-Man: Homecoming which was released on July 7, 2017.  The deal also allowed Sony to distribute and have creative control on any MCU film where Spider-Man is the main character (such as Homecoming and its sequel Spider-Man: Far From Home), while Disney will distribute MCU films where Spider-Man appears without being the main character.

On January 22, 2014, SPE folded its technology unit into the various cores of its businesses. In April, Sony Pictures arranged a film financing deal worth $200 million with LStar Capital, the credit venture of Lone Star Capital and Citibank, half in debt and the other in equity to fund most of SPE's film slate for several years. SPE was originally considering a $300 million deal with Blue Anchor Entertainment, led by Bloom Hergott partner John LaViolette and former investment banker & producer Joseph M. Singer, and backed by Longhorn Capital Management and Deutsche Bank, which was held up by regulatory matters.

In November 2019, Sony purchased the remaining 42% stake in GSN from AT&T, placing it under the direction of its television division.

In April 2021, Sony signed a first-look deal with Netflix, allowing the streaming service to host their films following their theatrical runs and home media releases. That same month, the company also entered into a multi-year licensing agreement with The Walt Disney Company for its films to stream across Disney's streaming and linear platforms, including Disney+ and Hulu.
 
In February 2022, Sony signed a deal with WarnerMedia Europe to stream its theatrical films on HBO Max for Central and Eastern Europe countries.

On November 28, 2022, it was announced that Legendary Entertainment reached a distribution deal with Sony to distribute its future slate of films, This deal does not include the  Dune and MonsterVerse films as they will remain at Warner Bros., The deal comes after the negative impact of the merger of Warner Bros.' parent company WarnerMedia with Discovery, Inc. to form Warner Bros. Discovery.

On December 8, 2022, Sony signed a deal with Crave as part of a Pay-One window licensing agreement, the two companies have entered a long-term deal, kickstarting April 2023.

2014 hack 

In November 2014, the Sony Pictures computer network was compromised by a group of hackers named Guardians of Peace, disabling many computers. Later the same week, five of Sony Pictures' movies were leaked, including some not yet released (such as Fury and Annie), as well as confidential data about 47,000 current and former Sony employees. Film historian Wheeler Winston Dixon suggested that the hack, which exposed the inner workings of the studio, was "not a pretty picture," and served as a "wake-up call to the entire industry." The hack also revealed some other documents, emails between Hollywood moguls referring to Barack Obama's cinematic tastes, a possible partnership with Marvel Studios for the inclusion of the superhero Spider-Man in Captain America: Civil War, which was later confirmed in February 2015, amongst others. On December 16, the hackers issued a warning to moviegoers, threatening to attack anyone who sees The Interview during the holidays and urging people to "remember the 11th of September 2001". On December 17, 2014, Sony cancelled the previously planned December 25 release of The Interview in response to hacker threats.

On February 24, 2015, Tom Rothman was named chairman of SPE's motion picture group to replace Amy Pascal.

On April 16, 2015, WikiLeaks published over 30,287 documents, 173,132 e-mails, and 2,200 corporate e-mail addresses of Sony Pictures' employees. WikiLeaks said in a press release that the content of the leaks were "newsworthy and at the center of a geo-political conflict" and belonged "in the public domain". Sony Pictures later condemned the hack and subsequent leaks, calling it a "malicious criminal act", while also criticizing WikiLeaks for describing the leaked content as public domain.

Seth Rogen has expressed doubts about North Korea being responsible for the 2014 Sony hack. Based on the timeline of events and the amount of information hacked, he believes the hack may have been conducted by a Sony employee.

Corporate structure 
Headquartered in Culver City, California, U.S., SPE comprises various studios and entertainment brands, including Columbia Pictures, Screen Gems, TriStar Pictures and GSN.

Senior management team 
 Anthony Vinciquerra
 Chairman and CEO, Sony Pictures Entertainment
 Tom Rothman
 Chairman, Sony Pictures Motion Picture Group

Motion Pictures and Home Entertainment 

 Sony Pictures Motion Picture Group: formerly Columbia TriStar Motion Picture Group. With a library of more than 4,000 films (including 12 Academy Award for Best Picture winners), as of 2004 this unit of Sony distributes about 22 films a year under its various studio brands in 67 countries. The group owns studio facilities in the United States, Hong Kong, Madrid, Mexico, the United Kingdom, Brazil and Japan.
 Columbia Pictures: Founded in 1924 by Harry Cohn, Sony acquired the studio in 1989 from The Coca-Cola Company for $3.4 billion.
 TriStar Pictures: Formed in 1982 as a joint venture between Columbia Pictures, HBO, and CBS. Became part of Columbia Pictures Entertainment in December 1987 and the Sony ownership in 1989. Was relaunched in 2004 as a marketing and acquisitions unit that specializes in the genre and independent films.
 TriStar Productions: A joint-venture between Thomas Rothman and SPE.
 Screen Gems: Originally Columbia's animation division and later a television production company best known for TV's Bewitched and The Partridge Family, as well as bringing The Three Stooges short subjects to TV in 1958. Sony revived the Screen Gems brand in 1998 to develop mid-priced movies (production budget of between $20 million and $50 million) in specific genres such as science fiction, horror, black cinema and franchise films.
 Sony Pictures Imageworks
 Sony Pictures Animation
 Sony Pictures Classics: Founded in 1992, Sony's specialty film label that distributes, produces and acquires films such as documentaries, independent and arthouse films in the United States and internationally.
 3000 Pictures
 Sony Pictures Releasing: Founded in 1994 as a successor to Triumph Releasing Corporation. The unit handles distribution, marketing, and promotion for films produced by Sony Pictures Entertainment; including Columbia Pictures, TriStar Pictures, Screen Gems, Sony Pictures Classics, among others.
 Sony Pictures Releasing International (formerly Columbia TriStar Film Distributors International)
 Sony Pictures India: A production house established by Sony to release Indian movies and distribute Hollywood movies released under Columbia Pictures.
 Sony Pictures International Productions: A division that produces films in local languages ​​other than English around the world.
 Sony Pictures Home Entertainment: Founded in 1978 as Columbia Pictures Home Entertainment. Currently manufactures and distributes the Sony film and television libraries on Blu-ray, Ultra HD Blu-ray, 3D Blu-ray, DVD, and digital download
 Sony Wonder: The former kids and family label of Sony Music Entertainment that was moved to SPHE on June 21, 2007.
 Genius Brands (minority stake)
Wow Unlimited Media
Mainframe Studios
Frederator Networks
Ezrin Hirsh Entertainment
 Sony Pictures Worldwide Acquisitions (SPWA): A Sony division which acquires and produces about 60 films per year for a wide variety of distribution platforms, especially for non-theatrical markets. It had been called "Worldwide SPE Acquisitions, Inc." until September 2010.
 Destination Films: A motion picture company which currently specializes in action, thriller, sci-fi, niche and low-end to medium-end horror films was purchased by Sony in 2001.
 Stage 6 Films: A direct-to-video label created in 2007. Also releases some films theatrically.
 Affirm Films: A motion picture label launched in 2008 to release gospel and Christian films.
 Pure Flix: A streaming service, owned by Affirm Films.

Television

U.S. production and distribution 
 Sony Pictures Television: (formerly Columbia TriStar Television Group) The successor-in-interest to Columbia's television division (first Screen Gems, later Columbia Pictures Television, TriStar Television, and Columbia TriStar Television), as of 2004 the unit was producing 60 titles for various television outlets globally. Contains a library that includes more than 35,000 episodes of more than 270 television series and 22,000 game show episodes under the Sony Pictures Television brand, and the television rights to the Embassy Pictures library (including The Graduate and The Lion in Winter) and also the owner of the television division "Embassy Television"—among most recent notable shows in this library are Party of Five, The Shield, Seinfeld, The King of Queens, Days of Our Lives and The Young and the Restless. Their former international distribution division, Sony Pictures Television International, was responsible for global distribution for the SPE film and television properties worldwide. Formerly known as Columbia TriStar International Television from 1992 to 2002.
 Affirm Television: Affirm Films' television division.
 Embassy Row: A television and digital production company by Michael Davies. SPT acquired the company on January 14, 2009.
 TriStar Television: Originally launched in 1986 and folded into Columbia Pictures Television in 1988. Relaunched in 1991 and became in-name-only in 1999. Relaunched again in 2015 as a production label within SPT.
 Sony Pictures Television Studios: An in-production name launched on July 25, 2017, to carry out the SPT library, starting on January 7, 2020.

International production 
 2waytraffic: Acquired by Sony in 2008, this television production company owns a number of formats, most notably including Who Wants to Be a Millionaire?.
 Blueprint Television: (small stake)
 Electric Ray: Founded by Karl Warner with SPT in January 2014.
 Floresta
 Huaso: A Chinese joint venture production company launched in 2004 by Sony Pictures Television International and Hua Long Film Digital Production Co., Ltd. of the China Film Group in Beijing.
 Left Bank Pictures: A UK production company founded by Andy Harries, Francis Hopkinson, and Marigo Kehoe in 2007. Majority stake acquired by SPT in 2012.
 Playmaker Media: An Australian production company acquired by SPT in 2014.
 Silvergate Media: A British production company acquired by SPT in 2019, best known for the  Hilda and Octonauts animated series.
 Starling
 Stellify Media: A joint venture between SPT, Kieran Doherty, and Matt Worthy launched in 2014 for Northern Ireland.
 Teleset

Television networks

United States 
 Sony Cine
 Game Show Network
 GetTV
 Sony Movies

International 
 AXN: Formed in 1997, AXN is Sony's entertainment television network, which airs across Asia, Latin America and Europe.
 Sony Entertainment Television

Other Sony Pictures operations 
 Columbia TriStar Marketing Group (CTMG)
 Crunchyroll, LLC, a joint venture co-owned with Sony Music Entertainment Japan's Aniplex focusing on distribution of anime series and films. Other divisions include Crunchyroll Studios and Crunchyroll Games, LLC.
 Crunchyroll, a streaming service.
 Crunchyroll UK and Ireland, the British division of Crunchyroll, LLC.
 Madman Anime, the Australian division of Crunchyroll, LLC.
 Crunchyroll EMEA, the division of Crunchyroll, LLC that serves Africa, the Middle East and non-English speaking Europe.
 Crunchyroll SAS, the French division of Crunchyroll EMEA.
 Crunchyroll SA, the Swiss division of Crunchyroll EMEA.
 Crunchyroll GmbH, the German division of Crunchyroll EMEA.
 Right Stuf, an anime distributor and online shop.
 Nozomi Entertainment, the anime label of Right Stuf.
 5 Points Pictures, the live-action label of Right Stuf.
 RightStufAnime.com, the online shop for Right Stuf.
 Ghost Corps: Oversees projects relating to the Ghostbusters franchise, including films, television shows, and merchandising.
 Madison Gate Records
 Pixomondo
 Sony Pictures Family Entertainment Group
 Sony Pictures Consumer Products
 Sony Pictures Interactive

 Sony Pictures Cable Ventures, Inc.
 Sony Pictures Studios: The actual physical buildings, land and movie-making equipment properties in Culver City, California. Includes 22 sound stages, ranging in size from 7,600 to 43,000 square feet (700 to 4,000 m2)
 Sony Pictures Plaza
 Sony Pictures Europe: Offices located at 25 Golden Square, London, England
 Sony Pictures Studios Post Production Facilities
 Worldwide Product Fulfillment

Related Sony Pictures divisions 
The following are other Sony Pictures divisions that are not subsidiaries of the California-based Sony Pictures Entertainment, but are instead subsidiaries of the main Tokyo-based Sony Corporation.

 Sony Pictures Entertainment Japan (SPEJ): The company plans, produces, manufactures, sells, imports, exports, leases, broadcasts and distributes movies, TV programs, videos and audio-visual software in Japan. The company website says it was established on February 10, 1984, predating Sony's acquisition of Columbia Pictures Entertainment by 5 years. SPEJ was formed in 1991 through the merger of Columbia TriStar Japan, RCA-Columbia Pictures Video Japan, and Japan International Enterprises. Based in Tokyo, Japan.
 The California-based Sony Pictures Entertainment holds a majority share of SPEJ.
 Animax: Instituted in Japan by Sony in 1998, Animax is the world's largest anime television network, with respective networks operating across Japan, East Asia, Southeast Asia, and formerly South Asia, South America, Africa and other regions.
 Sony Pictures Digital Productions Inc. (SPDP): A subsidiary of Sony Corporation based in Japan.
 Sony Station
 Sony Pictures Network
 Sony Pictures Digital Networks
 SPiN
 SoapCity
 Screenblast
 Advanced Platform Group APG
 Culver Max Entertainment: A subsidiary of Sony Corporation based in India. Sony Entertainment Television and Sony SAB are its main brands. It also owns many other companies and brands under the Sony brand.
 Sony SAB
 Sony Aath
 Sony BBC Earth (joint venture with BBC Studios)
 Sony Entertainment Television
 Sony Max
 Sony Max 2
 Sony Pal
 Sony Pix
 Sony Six
 Sony Ten
 Sony Wah
 Sony Yay

Notes 

  Sony Pictures Releasing became Sony Pictures's current film distributor in 1994.

References

External links 
  
 SonyPictures.net (Sony Pictures Global Gateway)
 Sony Pictures Entertainment Museum
 Sony Pictures Entertainment collection, circa 1920s–1960s, Margaret Herrick Library, Academy of Motion Picture Arts and Sciences

 
Film distributors of the United States
Film production companies of the United States
Entertainment companies based in California
Multinational companies
Pictures Entertainment
Companies based in Culver City, California
1987 establishments in California
American companies established in 1991
Entertainment companies established in 1991
Mass media companies established in 1991
1991 establishments in California
American subsidiaries of foreign companies
American film studios
Major film studios